
Apocalypso may refer to:

Music

Albums 
Apocalypso (The Motels album), 2011
Apocalypso (The Presets album), 2008

Songs 
"Apocalypso", a 2014 song by Dave Weckl & Jay Oliver
"Apocalypso", a 1984 song by Mental As Anything
"Apocalypso", a 2005 song by Mew
"Apocalypso", a 1980 song by The Monochrome Set
"The Apocalypso", a 1985 song by Singing Fools
"Apocalypso", a 2016 song by Wizo
"Apocalypso", a 1994 song by Jimmy Buffett

Novels 
Apocalypso (novel), a 1998 novel by Robert Rankin